Rayer is a surname. Notable people with this surname include:

 Christian Rayer (born 1945), French motorcycle racer
 Ellie Rayer (born 1996), English field hockey player
 Francis G. Rayer (1921-1981), British science fiction writer
 Mike Rayer (born 1965), Welsh rugby union player
 Pierre François Olive Rayer (1793–1867), French physician
 RSN Rayer (born 1971), Malaysian politician and lawyer

See also
 Rayer Bazaar, Dhaka